Mount Bruce is the second highest mountain in the state of Western Australia.

It is a part of the Hamersley Range in the Pilbara. A number of walks exist on the mountain including the relatively easy Marandoo walk that offers a view over the Marandoo minesite, the more difficult Honey Hakea walk and the summit track.

Mount Bruce reaches , being  lower than Mount Meharry.

The Aboriginal name for the mountain is Punurrunha.

References

Mountains of Western Australia
Hamersley Range